This is a list of embassies and consulates of Turkey in countries around the world, representing Turkish interests and providing consular services to Turkish citizens abroad. These diplomatic missions serve as a vital link between Turkey and the international community, promoting trade, cultural exchange, and diplomatic relations. With 258 diplomatic and consular missions, Turkey has the 5th largest diplomatic network in the world.

Africa

Americas

Asia

Europe

Oceania

Intergovernmental organizations

Embassies to open

Consulates to open
  – Aden
  – Chengdu
  – Chennai
  – Eindhoven
  – Gothenburg
  – Ho Chi Minh City
  – Kandahar
  – Kassel
  – Kharkiv
  – Kirkuk
  – Kolkata
  – Lviv
  – Najaf
  – Niš
  – Rio de Janeiro
  – Sabha
  – San Francisco
  – Shusha
  – Turkistan
  – Türkmenbaşy
  – Vlorë

Gallery

See also

 Foreign relations of Turkey
 List of diplomatic missions in Turkey

Notes

External links
 Ministry of Foreign Affairs of Turkey

References

 
Turkey
Diplomatic missions